Robert Lundström (born 1 November 1989) is a Swedish footballer currently playing for GIF Sundsvall.

Honours
AIK
 Allsvenskan: 2018

References

External links
 

1989 births
Living people
Association football defenders
GIF Sundsvall players
Allsvenskan players
Superettan players
Swedish footballers
Swedish expatriate footballers
Expatriate footballers in Norway
Swedish expatriate sportspeople in Norway
Vålerenga Fotball players
Eliteserien players
AIK Fotboll players
People from Sundsvall
Sportspeople from Västernorrland County